Oliver Reed Smoot, Jr. (born August 24, 1940) is an MIT alumnus who was chairman of the American National Standards Institute (ANSI) from 2001 to 2002 and president of the International Organization for Standardization (ISO) from 2003 to 2004.

The term is named for Smoot from his undergraduate days when he was used as a unit of measure on the Harvard Bridge at MIT during a fraternity pledge activity.

Early life and education
Smoot was born August 24, 1940 in Bexar County, Texas. He attended MIT in Cambridge, Massachusetts, where he was a member of Lambda Chi Alpha fraternity and obtained a Bachelor of Science in 1962. He then attended Georgetown University Law Center in Washington, D.C., where he obtained his JD.

Career
From 2000–2005, he served as vice president for external voluntary standards relations of the Information Technology Industry Council (ITI). Prior to that, he was ITI's executive vice president for 23 years. 

Smoot gave a speech to a hearing of the U.S. House Committee on Science, Space, and Technology's Subcommittee on Technology on March 20, 2000, titled "The Role of Technical Standards in Today's Society and in the Future".

He returned to MIT on October 4, 2008, for a 50th anniversary celebration, including the installation of a plaque on the bridge. Smoot was also presented with an official unit of measurement: a smoot stick. On May 7, 2016, he served as the grand marshal of the parade marking the centenary of MIT's moving from Boston's Back Bay into Cambridge.

Personal life
Smoot lives in San Diego with his spouse Sandra Smoot. He is also a representative of the MIT Education Council. He has two sons, both of whom also attended MIT. 

Smoot is a distant relative of Senator Reed Smoot.

References

External links
 
 
 
 
 "Someone San Diego show know", San Diego Tribune, October 9, 2020    

1940 births
Living people
Georgetown University Law Center alumni
Lambda Chi Alpha
Massachusetts Institute of Technology alumni